Ouderkerk aan de Amstel is a town in the province of North Holland, Netherlands. It is largely a part of the municipality of Ouder-Amstel; it lies about 9 km south of Amsterdam. A small part of the town lies in the municipality of Amstelveen. It is connected to Amsterdam by the river Amstel. There is another village called Ouderkerk in South Holland, Ouderkerk aan den IJssel.

History 
The village was first mentioned in 1308 as Ouderkerken, and means "old church". Old was probably added to distinguish from another village, however it is not clear which village. A candidate is Nieuwerkerk which disappeared in the Haarlemmermeer, but it can also refer to Amstelveen.

Ouderkerk developed at the confluence of the Bullewijk into the Amstel river. The castle of the van Amstel family was probably located on across the present church, however it was destroyed in 1204. From the 17th century onwards, estates were built in Ouderkerk aan de Amstel by the Amsterdam merchants.

Main sights
The town is the location of the Beth Haim of Ouderkerk aan de Amstel, the oldest Jewish cemetery in the Netherlands, as well as a neogothic Roman Catholic church that was designed by Pierre Cuypers in 1865.

Gallery

References

Populated places in North Holland
Amstelveen
Ouder-Amstel